Events in the year 1879 in Brazil.

Incumbents
Monarch – Pedro II
Prime Minister – Viscount of Sinimbu

Events

Births

Deaths

References

1870s in Brazil
Years of the 19th century in Brazil
Brazil
Brazil